Fire Danger Season is a 4-CD box set released by Der Blutharsch. It is limited to 2,222 copies. The first 222 copies were special edition, packaged in a leather army satchel. The first disc is a special iron cross shaped cut out mini cd containing unreleased tracks. The second disc contains tracks released on various compilations. The third and fourth discs are Der Blutharsch tracks that are remixed by other artists.

Track listing

References

2003 compilation albums
2003 remix albums